Wilsinho is the Portuguese diminutive of the name Wilson. Wilsinho may refer to:

 Wilsinho (football manager) (born 1950), full name Wilson de Oliveira Riça, Brazilian football manager
 Wilsinho (footballer, born 1982), full name Wilson Antônio de Resende Júnior, Brazilian football forward
 Wilsinho (footballer, born 1999), full name Wilson de Paula Cavalheiro Filho, Brazilian football forward